The Documentation Centers of the Superior Chamber of the Federal Electoral Tribunal is an information unit specialized in electoral matters in Mexico, they are dependent on the General Directorate of Documentation
and its function is to be an auxiliary in the institutional work of the Tribunal.

The Federal Electoral Tribunal has seven updated documentation centers on legal and political-electoral matters, which provide direct information services to staff and the general public.

Infrastructure 

The Federal Electoral Tribunal has seven Documentation Centers:

Superior Court Documentation Center
Guadalajara Regional Court Documentation Center
Monterrey Regional Court Documentation Center
Xalapa Regional Court Documentation Center
Mexico City Regional Court Documentation Center
Toluca Regional Court Documentation Center
Specialized Court Documentation Center

Services 

The Documentation Centers offer services of materials and interlibrary loan, advice and information search along with database query.

See also
Federal Electoral Institute
Federal Electoral Tribunal

External links
Federal Electoral Tribunal website
Documentation Centers

References

Law of Mexico
Judiciary of Mexico
Elections in Mexico
Mexico